Arachnoides is a genus of sea urchin within the family Clypeasteridae, found in the Indo-Pacific oceans. The base is flat and the upper surface is convex.

If you are looking for a fern genus, its name is Arachniodes.

Species
The World Register of Marine Species list the following species as being in this genus:-

 Arachnoides placenta (Linnaeus, 1758) Australia to Philippines
 Arachnoides tenuis H. L. Clark, 1938 Western Australia

Arachnoides zelandiae Gray, 1855 New Zealand: Synonym of Fellaster zelandiae (Gray, 1855)

References

 Natural History Museum

Clypeasteridae
Echinoidea genera
Echinoderms of Oceania
Echinoderms of Asia